Towlak Rud (also Romanized as Towlak Rūd; also known as Towlagrūd) is a village in Pir Sohrab Rural District, in the Central District of Chabahar County, Sistan and Baluchestan Province, Iran. At the 2006 census, its population was 95, in 18 families.

References 

Populated places in Chabahar County